Bicholim is a city and a municipal council in North Goa district in the state of Goa, India.

Bicholim may also refer to:

 Bicholim taluk, an administrative region of Goa, India
 Bicholim (Goa Assembly constituency), a Goa Legislative Assembly constituency of the state of Goa, India
 Bicholim conflict, a Wikipedia hoax